The Jakab and Komor Square Synagogue in Subotica is a Hungarian Art Nouveau synagogue in Subotica, Serbia. It is the second largest synagogue in Europe after the Dohány Street Synagogue in Budapest. It was built in 1901-1902 during the administration of the Kingdom of Hungary (part of Austria-Hungary), according to the plans of Marcell Komor and Dezső Jakab replacing a smaller and less elaborate synagogue. It is one of the finest surviving pieces of religious architecture in the art nouveau style. It served the local Neolog community.

In 1974 the synagogue was designated a Monument of Culture; in  1990 it was designated a Monument of Culture of Exceptional Importance, and it is protected by Republic of Serbia.

The synagogue has long been plagued by conservation issues, though a decade-long partnership between the government and World Monuments Fund that ended in 2010 rendered the building watertight after years of water infiltration. Work on the restoration of the facades is the next phase of work on the synagogue.

Overview

The synagogue of Subotica is the only surviving Hungarian art nouveau Jewish place of worship in the world. Erected by a prosperous Jewish community of some 3000 souls between 1901 and 1903, it highlights the double, Hungarian-Jewish identity of its builders, who lived in a multi-ethnic, but predominantly Catholic city, which was the third largest of the Hungarian Kingdom and the tenth largest of the Habsburg Empire.

The community hired a not-yet established tandem of Hungarian art nouveau architects from Budapest, Dezső Jakab and Marcell Komor, who would later make a great imprint on the architecture of Subotica and Palić, the resort town near the city. The architects were ardent followers of Ödön Lechner, the father of Hungarian art nouveau style architecture, and later partisans of this movement, which unified Hungarian folklore elements with some Jewish structural principles and sometimes even Jewish motifs.

Besides lending the synagogue a distinct double identity in architectural terms, Jakab and Komor created a new space-conception of synagogue architecture in Hungary and deployed modern steel structure as well as an advanced technique of vaulting. Unlike period synagogues in Hungary that featured a predominantly basilica-like arrangement with a nave and two aisles, with or without a dome, this synagogue achieves a unified, tent-like central space under the sun, painted in gold on the apex of the dome. The women’s gallery and the dome are supported by four pairs of steel pillars covered with gypsum with a palm leaf relief. The large dome is a self-supporting, 3-5 centimeters thin shell-structure, formed in the spirit of Hungarian folklore. While many other synagogues have utilized light structures, they usually mimicked traditional arches and vaults.  The novelty of this synagogue is the sincere display of modern structure and modernity in general, of which Jews have been important advocates and generators.

The synagogue was fully renovated in multi-million renovation project financed mainly  by Hungarian and Serbian government and opened in march 2018

See also
Monument of Culture of Exceptional Importance
Tourism in Serbia
Jews in Serbia

External links
 Facebook site: https://www.facebook.com/synagogue24000
 https://web.archive.org/web/20080514013503/http://www.duke.edu/religion/graphic/subotica.html
 https://web.archive.org/web/20071028030928/http://www.bh.org.il/swj/general.php?places=31&language=1

References

Buildings and structures in Subotica
Synagogues in Serbia
Religious buildings and structures in Vojvodina
Neolog Judaism synagogues
Jewish Serbian history
Architecture in Serbia
Art Nouveau synagogues
Cultural Monuments of Exceptional Importance (Serbia)
Art Nouveau architecture in Serbia
Synagogues completed in 1903
7 Most Endangered Programme